Dryden Hunt (born 24 November 1995) is a Canadian professional ice hockey left wing for the Calgary Wranglers of the American Hockey League (AHL) while under contract to the Calgary Flames of the National Hockey League (NHL).

Playing career

Junior
Hunt played amateur junior hockey firstly with the Notre Dame Argos in the Saskatchewan Midget AAA Hockey League before moving back to his native British Columbia with the Kootenay Ice of the BC Hockey Major Midget League.

Hunt opted to pursue a major junior career in the Western Hockey League with the Regina Pats. During his fourth season with the club in 2014–15, Hunt was leading the Pats with 47 points in 37 games before he was traded to the Medicine Hat Tigers on 5 January 2015. He played out the season in contributing 36 points in 34 games.

Undrafted, Hunt opted to play his overage year in the WHL, and was acquired by the Moose Jaw Warriors before the 2015–16 season on 23 September 2015. Hunt continued to improve offensively, leading the Warriors and the League with 58 goals in 72 games. As an alternate captain he completed the regular season with 116 points before suffering a second round exit with 16 points in 10 post-season games. He was selected as the League's Player of the Year and earned a place on the East First All-Star Team.

In the closing stages of his final major junior season, Hunt was signed as a free agent to a three-year, entry-level contract with the Florida Panthers on 2 March 2016.

Professional
In the following 2017–18 season, Hunt was assigned to continue with the Thunderbirds. After 13 games on 9 November 2017, he received his first recall to the Panthers. He made his NHL debut with the Panthers in a 4-1 victory over the Buffalo Sabres on 10 November 2017.

After his fourth season within the Panthers organization, Hunt as an impending restricted free agent was not tendered a qualifying offer by Florida, releasing him as a free agent. On 10 October 2020, Hunt was signed to a one-year, two-way contract with the Arizona Coyotes. In the pandemic shortened 2020–21 season, Hunt remained on the Coyotes taxi squad and after his elevation in the roster and initially serving as a healthy scratch he made his debut for the Coyotes in a 4-3 defeat to the St. Louis Blues on 2 February 2021. Adding a physical presence when inserted into the lineup, Hunt posted 3 goals and 8 points through 26 games as the Coyotes missed the post-season.

On 28 July 2021, Hunt signed as a free agent to a two-year deal with the New York Rangers. In the 2021–22 season, Hunt made his Rangers debut on season opening night, featuring on the fourth line in a 5–1 defeat to the Washington Capitals on 13 October 2021. He made his 100th NHL appearance on 5 November 2021, in a 6–5 overtime defeat to the Edmonton Oilers before registering his first goal with the Rangers in a 2-1 defeat to the Toronto Maple Leafs on 18 November 2021. While one of the Rangers leaders in hits, Hunt was elevated in the line-up through the season and recorded a career-high three assists on 12 March 2022, in a 7–4 victory over the Dallas Stars. He finished the regular season finishing with career highs of 76 games for 6 goals, 11 assists and 17 points. He went scoreless in 3 playoff appearances as the Rangers reached the Eastern Conference finals.

In his final season under contract with the Rangers, Hunt began the 2022–23 season by scoring one goal in three games before he was placed on waivers on 19 October 2022. He was claimed the following day by defending champions, the Colorado Avalanche, on 20 October 2022. He made his debut on the fourth-line with the Avalanche in a 3-2 defeat to the Seattle Kraken on 21 October 2022. He registered his first point and goal with the Avalanche, in his 15th appearance, helping Colorado to a 4–1 win over Dallas Stars on 26 November 2022.

After 25 appearances with the Avalanche, having registered a lone goal, Hunt was again on the move after he was traded to the Toronto Maple Leafs in exchange for Denis Malgin on 19 December 2022. He scored his first goal for Toronto against the Florida Panthers. 

On 3 March 2023, the Maples Leafs traded Hunt to the Calgary Flames in exchange for Radim Zohorna.

Career statistics

Awards and honours

References

External links
 

1995 births
Living people
Arizona Coyotes players
Calgary Wranglers players
Canadian expatriate ice hockey players in the United States
Canadian ice hockey left wingers
Colorado Avalanche players
Florida Panthers players
Ice hockey people from British Columbia
Manchester Monarchs (ECHL) players
Medicine Hat Tigers players
Moose Jaw Warriors players
New York Rangers players
People from Nelson, British Columbia
Regina Pats players
Springfield Thunderbirds players
Toronto Maple Leafs players
Toronto Marlies players
Trail Smoke Eaters players
Undrafted National Hockey League players